Arianne Jessica Chernock (born 1975) is an American historian specialized in modern Britain and the history of Europe. She has written two books on women's rights and the history of women in the United Kingdom. Chernock is a professor at Boston University.

Life 
Chernock completed a B.A. magna cum laude in the department of history at Brown University in May 1997. She completed a M.A. (1999) and a Ph.D. (2004) in the department of history at University of California, Berkeley. Her dissertation committee chairs were Thomas W. Laqueur and Carla Hesse.

Chernock was an assistant professor in the university writing program at Columbian College of Arts and Sciences from 2004 to 2006. In 2006, she joined the faculty in the at Boston University department of history as an assistant professor. She was promoted to associate professor in 2013.

Selected works

References 

Living people
Place of birth missing (living people)
American women historians
Historians of the United Kingdom
Brown University alumni
University of California, Berkeley alumni
21st-century American historians
Columbian College of Arts and Sciences faculty
Boston University faculty
21st-century American women writers
1975 births